Loïc or Loick is a male personal forename chiefly used in Brittany, in western France, and in the Breton community in French-speaking countries.

Origins
Loïc is a Breton given name, based on Laou, a Breton diminutive of Gwilherm or Gwilhom (like Bill is a diminutive of William), with the diminutive ending ig (like Billy). Non-Breton speaking Bretons often think it is the Breton form of the name Louis.
  
In Provence, in southeastern France, many think that it actually is "the old Provençal form of Louis", in which case it means "Famed Warrior". 

Another less well accepted explanation of the origin of the name is that its source is "Loukas", a Greek name meaning "One from Lucania". This would group the name with other names that have this root, such as Luke, Luc and Lucas.

Notable people with the name

Loïc
Loïc Amisse, French football manager
Loïc Bigois, French Formula One aerodynamicist
Loïc Bruni, French downhill mountain bike racer
Loïc Costerg, French bobsledder
Loïc Courteau, French tennis player
Loïc De Kergret, French volleyball player
Loïc Druon, French footballer
Loïc Duval, French race car driver
Loïc Guillon, French football defender
Loïc Jacquet, French rugby union player
Loïc Jean-Albert, French parachutist
Loïc Jouannigot, French children's book illustrator
Loïc Le Meur, French blogger
Loïc Leferme, French diver
Loïc Loval, French football player
Loïc Lumbilla Kandja, French football player
Loïc Matile, French entomologist
Loïc Meillard, Swiss alpine skier
Loïc Négo, Hungarian football player
Loïc Nottet, Belgian singer
Loïc Perizzolo, Swiss racing cyclist
Loïc Perrin, French football player
Loïc Rémy, French football player
Loïc Wacquant, French sociologist

Loick
Loick Essien, English singer
Loïck Peyron, French yachtsman
 Loick Landre

Loïk
Loïk Le Floch-Prigent, manager

References

Masculine given names
French masculine given names
Breton masculine given names